David John Coles was  Bishop of Christchurch in the Anglican Church in Aotearoa, New Zealand and Polynesia from 1990 to 2008.

He was born on 23 March 1943 and educated at Auckland Grammar School and the University of Auckland. He was ordained in 1969 and began his career with a curacy at St Mark, Remuera and after that Chaplain of Hulme Hall at the University of Manchester. From 1974 to 1976 he was Vicar of Glenfield then Takapuna. In 1980 he became Dean of St John’s Cathedral, Napier and in 1984 of Christchurch. He was succeeded by Victoria Matthews. He was consecrated a bishop on 6 July 1990. He has been married twice, first to Ceridwyn Mary Coles and subsequently to Joy Coles.

References

1943 births
People educated at Auckland Grammar School
University of Auckland alumni
Deans of Christchurch
Anglican bishops of Christchurch
Living people